The national football team of the Two Sicilies is the football team of the Two Sicilies, which are a territory formed by  the southern part of Italy without the Island of Sicily although the name suggests otherwise . As the Two Sicilies are not a recognised state they are neither a member of FIFA nor UEFA, and the team therefore is not eligible to enter either the World Cup or European Championship. However, from January 2010, they became a provisional member of the NF-Board. Now the team is a member of ConIFA.

History
In December 2008, the national football team of the Two Sicilies was established on the initiative of Guglielmo Di Grezia and Antonio Pagano, with the purpose, then not achieved, to participate in the 2009 VIVA World Cup. On April 30, 2009, the team played its first match against Padania in Darfo Boario Terme during the charity tournament "1° Trofeo SMArathon".

They made their VIVA World Cup debut against Iraqi Kurdistan, of the fourth edition of the tournament. Two Sicilies took fourth place, losing the 3rd-place match against Occitania.
On 23 September 2010 the team took part in the second edition of "Trofeo del Mediterraneo", against Gozo and ASD Castellana, which they went on to win.

Regno delle Due Sicilie FA 

The Regno delle Due Sicilie FA is The Football Association of Two Sicilies.

Team image

Kit suppliers

Competitive record

World Cup record

European Cup record

Mediterranean Trophy

Results and fixtures

Managers

See also
 :Category:Footballers from Campania
 :Category:Footballers from Sicily

References

External links
 Official site
  Nazionale di Calcio del Regno delle Due Sicilie
 CONIFA page
 Viva World Cup

CONIFA member associations
European N.F.-Board teams
Sport in Sicily
Sport in Campania
Sport in Molise
Sport in Calabria
Sport in Basilicata
Sport in Apulia
Sport in Abruzzo
Football teams in Italy